is a Japanese actor and voice actor from Fuchu, Tokyo. He also performed the opening for the anime Sorcerer Hunters with Megumi Hayashibara in which he voiced the main character. He also performed an insert song for the anime H2 as he voiced the main character as well.

Filmography
F (1988) as Tamotsu Oishi
Jungle Emperor (1989) as Leo
Ranma ½ (1989) as Pantyhose Taro and Genji Heita
Urusei Yatsura: Always My Darling (1991) as Rio
H2 (1995) as Hiro Kunimi
Junkers Come Here (1995) as Junkers
Kuma no Pūtarō (1995) as Putaro
Sorcerer Hunters (1995) as Carrot Glace
Haunted Junction (1997) as Kazumi "Kazuo" Ryudo 
Arcade Gamer Fubuki (2002) as Arashi

TV Drama roles
Code Blue as Ooyama Tsuneo (Mary Jane Yoko)

References

External links
 Shinnosuke Furumoto at Hitoshi Doi's Seiyuu Database 
 Shinnosuke Furumoto at GamePlaza Haruka's Voice Acting Database 
 
 Shinnosuke Furumoto profile at Oricon 

1969 births
Living people
Japanese male child actors
Japanese male video game actors
Japanese male voice actors
Male voice actors from Tokyo Metropolis
People from Fuchū, Tokyo